Brian Anderson (born June 7, 1971) is an American sportscaster. Since 2007, he has called play-by-play for the Milwaukee Brewers' telecasts on Bally Sports Wisconsin. As a part of his work on the 2007 Brewers Preview Show, Anderson and the Bally's team were awarded a regional Emmy Award.

Anderson also calls NCAA tournament basketball for Turner Sports, regular season NCAA basketball for FOX Sports and the Big Ten Network, MLB games for TBS, NBA games for TNT, and "The Match" golf franchise for TNT.

Broadcasting career

Early career
From 1998 to 2000, Anderson handled Minor League and Little League Baseball telecasts for ESPN. He received his start in baseball with the San Antonio Missions, the Double-A affiliate of the San Diego Padres, serving as a radio/television play-by-play announcer from 1994 to 1998 and from 2000 to 2003.

Anderson worked as a play-by-play announcer at The Golf Channel from 2003 to 2006. In his role there, he served as a host for a variety of the network's events, including the PGA and Nationwide Tours. Anderson also worked at FSN Southwest as a sideline reporter for the San Antonio Spurs from 1999 to 2007, where he saw the Spurs win three NBA Championships.

Starting in 2007, Anderson moved on to be the play-by-play announcer for the Milwaukee Brewers on Fox Sports Wisconsin. He is joined by color commentator Bill Schroeder. The duo occasionally also did games for WMLW, a local over-the-air channel in the Milwaukee metro area, but Fox Sports Wisconsin has since become the exclusive local broadcast partner for the Brewers.  Anderson remains a member of the Brewers' broadcast booth today.

National work
Since 2008, Anderson has been tapped by TBS to provide play-by-play for the network's coverage of the postseason, calling the Brewers-Phillies National League Division Series in 2008, the Rockies-Phillies series in 2009, the Reds-Phillies series in 2010 and the Yankees-Tigers American League Division Series in 2011. In 2012, Anderson worked the NL Wild Card Game and NLDS. In 2013, he worked the American League Wild Card tiebreaker between the Rays and Rangers, the AL Wild Card Game and ALDS. From 2014 to 2017, Anderson served as the secondary play-by-play announcer for TBS during the Division Series.

Because of Ernie Johnson stepping aside for the 2011 playoffs to care for his son Michael (who suffers from muscular dystrophy and was placed in intensive care around the same time as the playoffs), Anderson called the 2011 National League Championship Series for TBS, which only by coincidence had the Brewers against the Cardinals; his role was announced before the playoff seedings for the NLDS were fully set. Anderson again returned to calling LCS in 2017, when he called the 2017 National League Championship Series for TBS,  as Ernie Johnson was preoccupied with his NBA on TNT duties. He has continued to call the LCS every year since.

In 2018, Anderson once again served as lead play-by-play announcer during the MLB postseason in place of Johnson, who stepped aside due to blood clots and being advised not to fly. In this role, Anderson was on the call of the first-ever Division Series featuring the New York Yankees and Boston Red Sox.

In 2010, TBS named him as play-by play announcer on Sunday MLB on TBS regular season broadcasts.

In addition, Anderson started calling NCAA basketball games for ESPN during the 2009–2010 season.

In 2012, he began calling NCAA basketball games for the Big Ten Network, concluding in covering the early rounds of the Big Ten Basketball tournament.

Since 2012, Anderson has called play-by-play for Turner Sports and CBS's coverage of the NCAA Division I men's basketball tournament and NBA.

In 2013, he was named lead host for TNT's exclusive coverage of the PGA Grand Slam of Golf.

Anderson is currently a play-by-play announcer for Fox College Hoops.

Anderson replaced an ailing Marv Albert to call undefeated Kentucky's thrilling 68–66 win over Notre Dame at the 2015 NCAA Midwest Regional final in Cleveland, Ohio. He also served as commentator for the Michigan State Spartans team cast during their Final Four game against Duke.

Beginning in 2014, Anderson added NBA on TNT duties to his resume, usually in a fill-in position or as a 3rd announcer when TNT features a rare tripleheader that night, such as on MLK day. He also extensively covers the first two rounds of the NBA playoffs in this position. Until 2021, Wisconsin Badgers play-by-play man Matt Lepay substituted for him on Fox Sports Wisconsin for Brewers games when Anderson was away calling the NBA.

Anderson also began calling some NFL on CBS games during the busier weeks of the 2014 NFL season, when the network's six or seven announcing teams weren't enough to cover the network's games.

Anderson called the 2019 PGA Championship for Golf on TNT, which was the last year for TNT's golf coverage.

Prior to the 2019-20 NBA season, it was announced that as a replacement to the recently eliminated "Players Only" broadcasts which occurred on Tuesday nights beginning during the 2nd half of the season, TNT would instate a more traditional broadcast format to their Tuesday Night slate of games. Anderson was announced to be one of the play-by-play announcers to the weekly scheduled doubleheader, along with longtime Nets announcer Ian Eagle. Anderson is partnered with either Stan Van Gundy or Jim Jackson.

Anderson was on the call for TNT's "The Match" golf series for the May 2020 event featuring Tiger Woods and Peyton Manning defeating Phil Mickelson and Tom Brady from Hobe Sound, Florida, in November 2020 when Mickelson and Charles Barkley defeated Manning and Stephen Curry in Oro Valley, Arizona, in July 2021 in Moonlight Basin, Montana when Bryson DeChambeau and Aaron Rodgers defeated Mickelson and Brady, in November 2021 when Brooks Koepka defeated DeChambeau in Las Vegas, Nevada, and in June 2022 when Rodgers and Brady defeated Josh Allen and Patrick Mahomes, also in Las Vegas.

Notable calls 

September 27, 2008 – Anderson was the play-by-play announcer for the final game of the 2008 Milwaukee Brewers season for Fox Sports Wisconsin, where Ryan Braun hit a two-run home run in the bottom of the 8th inning to give the Brewers the lead and eventual win, which led to a Wild Card berth and the first playoff berth for the Brewers in 26 years.And there's a drive into left field, this is hit well! AND IT'S GONE! RYAN BRAUN! A 2 RUN HOME RUN! THE BREWERS TAKE THE LEAD!
September 7, 2010 – Anderson called Trevor Hoffman's 600th career save for Fox Sports Wisconsin. Anderson's call of the final out:On the ground... Counsell, and there it is! Trevor Hoffman! A milestone, number 600!
October 6, 2010 – Anderson called Game 1 of the 2010 National League Division Series between the Cincinnati Reds and the Philadelphia Phillies for TBS, where Roy Halladay threw the second no-hitter in postseason history. Anderson's call of the final out:Halladay is one strike away, the 0-2... a bouncer. Ruiz, IN TIME! ROY HALLADAY, HAS THROWN A NO-HITTER! 
October 3, 2014 – Anderson called Game 2 of the 2014 American League Division Series between the Detroit Tigers and the Baltimore Orioles for TBS, where Delmon Young hit a bases clearing double to give the Orioles a 1-run lead in the bottom of the 8th inning. Bases loaded, Young swings! Line drive... that is down, and to the wall! Cruz is in, Pearce is in, Hardy is around 3rd, he's gonna try to score! And SAFE! THE ORIOLES HAVE THE LEAD! The legend of Delmon Young in the postseason continues!
March 20, 2016 – Anderson called the 2016 NCAA Tournament second round match-up between the 7th seeded Wisconsin Badgers and the 2nd seeded Xavier Musketeers, where Bronson Koenig hit a buzzer-beating three-pointer to send the Badgers to the Sweet Sixteen.Here we go. 2.0 to go. Trip to the Sweet Sixteen. Koenig's got it, rises up, [buzzer sounds] the shot and...IT'S GOOD! IT'S GOOD! WISCONSIN HAS WON IT!
October 15, 2017 – Anderson called Game 2 of the 2017 National League Championship Series between the Chicago Cubs and the Los Angeles Dodgers, where Justin Turner hit a walk-off 3-run home run to give the Dodgers a 2–0 lead on their way to winning the series. Anderson's call of the home run: And Turner, in the air to center field, that ball is hit well. Martinez is on the run, this is way back! AND, IT IS GONE! IT IS A WALK-OFF HOME RUN... FOR JUSTIN TURNER!   
March 22, 2018 – Anderson covered the 2018 Sweet Sixteen match-up between the 11th seeded Loyola-Chicago Ramblers and the 7th seeded Nevada Wolf Pack for CBS Sports. Loyola-Chicago had a 1-point lead until Marques Townes hit a 3 to help ice the game to advance the Ramblers to the Elite Eight. Custer... crossover, kicks it. Townes, for 3. YES SIR! MARQUES TOWNES!
April 22, 2018 –  Anderson called Game 1 of the 2018 Eastern Conference First Round match-up between the Milwaukee Bucks and the Boston Celtics, where Khris Middleton hit a buzzer beating 3 to tie the game at 99 just minutes after Terry Rozier hit a 3 to put the Celtics up with 0.5 seconds left in the 4th quarter.Who's going to get the last shot here? Gets it in, Middleton for the tie! OH MY GOODNESS! KHRIS MIDDLETON! TIES IT, WITH A LONG RANGE 3! And now they will check to see if he got it off in time, I think he did.
October 8, 2018 – Anderson called Game 3 of the 2018 American League Division Series between the Boston Red Sox and the New York Yankees for TBS, where Brock Holt hit for the first cycle in postseason history. Anderson's call of Holt's home run and completion of the cycle:That ball is ripped, down the right field line. That is a fair ball home run, and the cycle for Brock Holt! He hits for the cycle in a postseason game! So what if it's off a position player. History for Brock Holt. Single, triple, double, homer. 16–1 Boston, and a night Brock Holt will never forget.
October 17, 2018 – Anderson called Game 4 of the 2018 American League Championship Series between the Boston Red Sox and the Houston Astros for TBS. He called Andrew Benintendi's diving catch of Astros third baseman Alex Bregman's liner off Red Sox closer Craig Kimbrel to win Game 4. The Red Sox would go on to win the series in 5 games, on their way to their ninth World Series title. Anderson's call of the final play:
TBS analyst Ron Darling: This has been a bases loaded postseason for the Red Sox, this is the Astros' chance.Anderson: A base hit could tie it. Runners will be off at the crack of the bat with two outs. Kimbrel deals, Bregman, in the air to left field. Benintendi dives! And, HE MAKES THE CATCH! OH WHAT A PLAY! GAME SAVER! ANDREW BENINTENDI! The Red Sox win on a spectacular catch by Benintendi in left field. Wow! What a game! What a finish! The guts it takes to make that play. If it gets by him, it's over.
March 30, 2019 – Anderson called the Elite Eight match-up between the Purdue Boilermakers and the Virginia Cavaliers, where Mamadi Diakite made a floater to tie the game at 70 at the buzzer to send the game into overtime, where Virginia eventually won en route to winning the national championship.2 point game. Jerome... short. Back tap, Diakite. A race for it, into the hands of Clark. They got a chance to win it here. Up the front is Diakite, for the win! AND IT GOES! For the tie! Diakite! Squares it at 70! 
April 23, 2019 – Anderson called Game 5 of the 2019 Western Conference first-round match-up between the Oklahoma City Thunder and the Portland Trail Blazers, where Damian Lillard hit a three-pointer at the buzzer to win the game and the series for the Trail Blazers, and advance them to the second round of the playoffs.Chance right here, shot clock is off. Portland has a timeout. Lillard, a chance to send the Thunder home. Lillard, long range 3... [buzzer sounds] AND... IT'S GOOD! AT THE BUZZER! DAMIAN LILLARD! ARE YOU KIDDING ME?! 
October 15, 2019 – Anderson called Game 4 of the 2019 National League Championship Series between the Washington Nationals and the St. Louis Cardinals where the Nationals swept the Cardinals in four games to advance to the World Series for the first time in franchise history.In the air, center field...This should do it. Robles will squeeze it, AND THERE IT IS! The Washington Nationals are National League Champions!
September 3, 2020 –  Anderson called Game 3 of the 2020 Eastern Conference Semifinal match-up between the Toronto Raptors and the Boston Celtics, where OG Anunoby hit a buzzer beating 3 to win the game for the Raptors, moments after a Daniel Theis dunk puts the Celtics up with 0.5 seconds left in the 4th quarter.Series on the line, Anunoby got it off and...IT GOES! Did it count is the question? OG Anunoby buries the triple at the buzzer!
September 20, 2020 – Anderson called Game 2 of the 2020 Western Conference Finals between the Denver Nuggets and the Los Angeles Lakers held at the NBA bubble, where Anthony Davis hit a three-pointer at the buzzer to give the Lakers a 2–0 series lead.2.1 seconds remaining, Denver a foul to give, Jokić trying to disrupt Rondo. He puts it in. Here's Davis for three and the win...[buzzer sounds] OHHH, IT'S GOOD! ANTHONY DAVIS HAS WON IT FOR THE LAKERS!
December 14, 2021 – Anderson called an NBA game between the Golden State Warriors and the New York Knicks at Madison Square Garden, where Stephen Curry broke the league's all-time three-point record once held by Ray Allen.Alec Burks guarding him from the start, Wiggins again. Here's Curry for the record...IT's GOOD! AND THERE IT IS! Stephen Curry...the all-time three-point king of the NBA!
February 8, 2023 – Anderson called an NBA game between the Oklahoma City Thunder and the Los Angeles Lakers, where LeBron James scored a fadeaway jumper late in the third quarter to break the league's all-time scoring record once held by Kareem Abdul-Jabbar.Westbrook, looking for James, he's got it. Coming into the end of the third quarter, LeBron James, a shot in history...AND THERE IT IS! LEBRON STANDS ALONE! The NBA's all-time scoring record now belongs to LeBron James!

Personal life
Anderson played catcher on the nationally ranked baseball team at St. Mary's University, Texas and graduated cum laude from the school in 1993 with a degree in English communications. He has a wife and one child.  Anderson is the younger brother of former Reds pitcher Mike Anderson.

Anderson is a Christian. Anderson has spoken about his faith, saying "Not everything depends on what is happening in my particular space. I don’t live or die with my call of a game or a win or loss, or something good or bad at home. I know there is a greater picture, a greater hope; and that is eternity [in Heaven]. ... I will trust in God, who gave His only Son as the ultimate sacrifice, and He did it for me."

References

 https://web.archive.org/web/20070116035804/http://www.callofthegame.com/news/cogskinny.php
 https://web.archive.org/web/20070928010316/http://www.callofthegame.com/news/index.php?itemid=2146
 http://milwaukee.brewers.mlb.com/team/broadcasters.jsp?c_id=mil

1971 births
Living people
Alliance of American Football announcers
American sports announcers
American television sports announcers
College basketball announcers in the United States
College football announcers
Golf writers and broadcasters
Major League Baseball broadcasters
Milwaukee Brewers announcers
Minor League Baseball broadcasters
National Basketball Association broadcasters
National Football League announcers
People from Austin, Texas
St. Mary's University, Texas alumni